Ghandi Bread or Nan Ghandi ( means sugar loaf bread) is a traditional Iranian bread. It is often eaten with tea.

References 

Iranian breads
Iranian cuisine